Aulopora is an extinct genus of tabulate coral characterized by a bifurcated budding pattern and conical corallites. Colonies commonly encrust hard substrates such as rocks, shells and carbonate hardgrounds.

References

Tabulata
Prehistoric cnidarian genera
Fossil taxa described in 1829
Paleozoic life of Ontario
Paleozoic life of Alberta
Paleozoic life of Manitoba
Paleozoic life of New Brunswick
Paleozoic life of Newfoundland and Labrador
Paleozoic life of the Northwest Territories
Paleozoic life of Nunavut
Paleozoic life of Quebec